Thomas Browne (1766–1832) was a priest and academic in the late eighteenth and early nineteenth centuries.

Browne was born in Poulton-le-Fylde. He was educated at Christ's College, Cambridge, graduating BA in 1786; MA in 1789; and BD in 1796. He became Fellow in 1791; and was Master from 1808 to 1814. He held livings at Little Snoring, Seaton Ross, Bere Ferrers, Bourn, and Gorleston.

Browne married Lucy, a daughter of John Astley, and as a result was presented to the benefice of Gorleston in Norfolk.

References 

Alumni of Christ's College, Cambridge
Fellows of Christ's College, Cambridge
Masters of Christ's College, Cambridge
1832 deaths
1766 births
People from Poulton-le-Fylde